The Reconstruction is a 1970 Greek dramatic black and white independent art film directed by Theo Angelopoulos. It is the director's first feature film. While based on true events, it transcends them to recall the ancient myths of the Atrides and Clytemnestra.

In 1986, the Greek Film Critics Association named it the third-best Greek film in history.

Synopsis
In a remote village in Epirus, a woman murders her husband, who had just returned from Germany, where he had gone to work, with the help of her lover. The crime is never shown on screen. The main characters (judge, policemen, journalists) try to reconstruct and understand a news item that escapes them.

Technical information
Title: Αναπαράσταση (tr. Anaparastasi) 
Directed by: Theo Angelopoulos
Script: Theo Angelopoulos, Stratis Karras, and, Thanassis Valtinos
Cinematography: Giorgos Arvanitis
Art Department: Mikes Karapiperis
Sound: Thanassis Arvanitis 
Editing: Takis Davlopoulos
Production Manager: Christos Papayannopoulos 
Country of origin: Greece
Format: Black and white – Mono – 35 mm 
Genre: Drama
Duration: 100 Minutes 
Release date: 24 September 1970 (Thessaloniki Festival of Greek Cinema)

Cast
Toula Stathopoulou: Eleni Gousis 
Yannis Totsikas: Ranger Hristos Gikas
Thanos Grammenos: Eleni's Brother
Petros Hoedas: Investigator
Mihalis Fotopoulos: Eleni's Husband Kostas Gousis
Yannis Balaskas: Police Officer 
Nicos Alevras: Investigator's Assistant
Alekos Alexiou: Police Officer
Theo Angelopoulos, Christos Paliyannopoulos, Telis Samandas, Panos Papadopoulos, Adonis Lykouresis, Giorgos Arvanitis, Mersoula Kapsali: Journalists

Awards
It was awarded Best Film, Best Director, Best Supporting Actress and Best Cinematography at the Thessaloniki Festival of Greek Cinema in 1970, as well as Best Foreign Film at the Hyères Festival, International Federation of Film Critics Special Mention at the 21st Berlin International Film Festival and Prix Georges-Sadoul in 1971.

References

Bibliography
Michel Demopoulos, directeur de publication, Le Cinéma grec [Greek Cinema], Paris, Centre Georges Pompidou, collection «cinéma/pluriel,» 1995, 263 pages, . 
Vrasidas Karalis, A History of Greek Cinema, New York, New York and London, Continuum International Publishing Group, 2012, 344 pages, .
Sylvie Rollet, directeur de publication (préface: Theo Angelopoulos), Théorème 9: Théo Angelopoulos au fil du temps [Theo Angelopoulos over the Course of Time], Paris, Presses Sorbonne Nouvelle, 2007, 189 pages, . 
Stéphane Sawas, «Grèce (1967–1974) – Les écrans grecs sous la dictature des colonels: la grande rupture,» [Greece (1967–1974) – Greek Screens Under the Dictatorship of the Colonels: The Great Break] dans Raphaël Muller et Thomas Wieder, directeurs de publication, Cinéma et régimes autoritaires au xxe siècle: Écrans sous influence [Cinema and Authoritarian Regimes in the Twentieth Century: Screens Under Influence], Paris, Éditions École Normale Supérieure rue d'Ulm et Presses Universitaires de France, collection «Les rencontres de Normale Sup',» 2008, 285 pages, . 
Stéphane Sawas, «Entre amnésie collective et mémoire retrouvée: La guerre civile grecque au cinéma,» [Between Collective Amnesia and Rediscovered Memory: The Greek Civil War in Cinema] dans Carola Hähnel-Mesnard, Marie Liénard-Yeterian, et Cristina Marinas, directeurs de publication, Culture et mémoire: Représentations contemporaines de la mémoire dans les espaces mémoriels, les arts du visuel, la littérature et le théâtre [Culture and Memory: Contemporary Representations of Memory in Memorial Spaces, Visual Arts, Literature and Theater], Paris, Éditions de l'École Polytechnique et Éditions Ellipses, 2008, 534 pages, . 
Γιάννης Σολδάτος [Yannis Soldatos], Ιστορία του ελληνικού κινηματογράφου [History of Greek Cinema, tr. Istoría tou ellinikoú kinimatográfou], Β' Τόμος: 1967–1990, Αθήνα, Αιγόκερως, 2002, 383 σελίδες, .

External links

1970s Greek-language films
1970 films
1970 drama films
1970 independent films
1970 directorial debut films
Greek black-and-white films
Greek drama films
Films directed by Theodoros Angelopoulos
Films about death
Films about dysfunctional families
Films about journalists
Films about marriage
Films about police officers
Mariticide in fiction
Films based on classical mythology
Films set in Greece
Films set in Epirus
Films shot in Epirus